"Army" is an alternative rock song by the band Ben Folds Five from their 1999 album The Unauthorized Biography of Reinhold Messner. It reached number 28 on the charts in the UK.

Track listing

CD single I

CD single II

45 RPM single

Lyrics, composition, and popularity
The song deals with indecision, independence, conflict, and freedom in describing the narrator's struggles to find his way in life as he contemplates joining the military, enrolls in college and soon drops out, and joins a band. The lyrics contains many memorable moments, including the opening line ("Well I thought about the army / dad said 'Son, you're fucking high!'") and the bridge, which includes a horn section. The song is popular among fans, and has remained part of Folds's concerts in his solo career. 

Folds has explained at live performances that the entire song is based on personal experiences, with a few exceptions. He never grew a mullet, though the song's lyrics say "Grew a mustache and a mullet / Got a job a Chick-fil-A."

Here is Folds's explanation from a recording at Enmore:

The clean version is sometimes referred to as the "We Got the 'Fuck' Out edit".

Live performances
On the live album Ben Folds Live, Folds introduces the song to the audience by saying: "This one goes out to anyone who actually signed up and is in—is gone into the armed forces. Thanks a lot. I tried, I went down to the recruiting center and I talked to them, and I thought about it, but at the end of the day, I think I was genetically inclined to be a musician." He then goes on to instruct the audience in singing the horn parts: "We've got enough people in here to get a bitchin' horn section, so let's cut the audience down the middle. This side, saxophones, this side's trumpets." Later live audiences were split into "bitch and whore sections" by Ben, an auditory spin off of the phrase "bitchin' horn section" heard on Ben Folds Live. The ensemble parts are often performed by the crowds during concerts in an audience participation bit which Folds "conducts". In addition, the audience customarily sings the line, "God please spare me more rejection." Folds also frequently changes the last line from "the army" to "your mommy" or, on occasion, "all y'all's mommies".

In the DVD Sessions at West 54th, in the Spare Reels footage, Ben Folds Five can be seen recording the song. The lyrics are slightly different, and the horn parts are either scat sung by Folds or omitted.

In the Freaking Out DVD shot in Tokyo in 1999, Robert Sledge changes the line "God, please spare me more rejection!" to "God I've got a HUGE erection!"

"Army" was performed by the Legally Prohibited Band as Conan O'Brien's introduction music on his Legally Prohibited from Being Funny on Television Tour.

In popular culture 
The song is featured in the Viceland comedy series Nirvanna the Band the Show as the end credits theme song.

Ben Folds Five songs
1999 singles
Songs written by Ben Folds
1999 songs
550 Music singles